Nagarjuna is a 1961 Indian Kannada-language film, directed by Y. V. Rao and produced by K. N. Mallikarjuna. The film stars Rajkumar, Kanta Rao, G. Varalakshmi, Sandhya, Harini and Ramadevi. The film has musical score by Rajan–Nagendra. Y. V. Rao shot the movie simultaneously in Telugu as Naagaarjuna starring Kanta Rao. Rajkumar portrayed the role of Arjuna's son Iravan in the movie. He later on went on to portray the role of Arjuna's another son Babruvahana in the 1977 movie of the same name - making him the only actor to portray the role of Arjuna and his two sons. This remains the only movie in which YV Rao directed Rajkumar - since their second collaboration Hennina Baale Kanneeru was stalled after a portion of the shoot.

Cast

G. Varalakshmi
Sandhya
Harini
Ramadevi
Parvathi
Jayalakshmi
Rajeshwari
Kumari Meena
Rajkumar
Kanta Rao
Narasimharaju
V. Nagayya
K. S. Ashwath
Rajanala
Srikanth
Narayana
Master Sathyanarayana
Krishnappa
M. Raghavaiah
Shivakumar
M. S. Manyam
Ramaswamy
Shankar
Subramanyam
V. Nagarajan
Rajendra Prasad
B. Jaya
Sharada
Premakumari
Gangubai
Kalavathi
Narmadadevi

Soundtrack
The music was composed by Rajan–Nagendra.

References

External links
 

1961 films
1960s Kannada-language films
Films scored by Rajan–Nagendra
Films based on the Mahabharata
Indian multilingual films
1960s multilingual films
Films directed by Y. V. Rao